Amanda Spratt (born 17 September 1987) is an Australian road cyclist, who currently rides for UCI Women's WorldTeam .

Spratt was selected to represent Australia at the 2012 London and 2016 Rio Olympics. In 2012, 2016 and 2020 she won the Australian National Road Race Championships in Buninyong, Victoria. In 2018, she secured the silver medal in the UCI Road World Championships in Innsbruck, Austria.

Personal
Spratt, nicknamed "Spratty", was born on 17 September 1987 in Penrith, New South Wales, which is a suburb of Sydney. She went to Springwood Public School before going to Blue Mountains Grammar School for high school. From 2007 to 2008, she attended Charles Sturt University where she earned a University Certificate in Business. , she lived in Springwood, New South Wales. 

Spratt is a member of the Riders Council of The Cyclists' Alliance.

Cycling

Spratt raced in BMX events as a junior and competed in the BMX World Championships in Melbourne when she was 11. She began road and track racing when she was twelve years old. She has been coached by Martin Barras since 2009 and is also coached by Gary Sutton. Her primary training base is in Australia's Blue Mountains region, with a secondary training base in Varase, Italy where she lives eight months a year. She is a member of the Penrith Cycling Club. She has held a cycling scholarship with the Australian Institute of Sport and the NSW Institute of Sport.

Spratt competed at the 2004 World Junior Track Championships in the United States. She competed at the 2004 Commonwealth Youth Games. She competed at the 2004 Junior Road World Championships in Italy. She missed most of the 2009 cycling season because of a back injury. She competed at the 2010 UCI Road World Championships. She finished eleventh at the 2011 Giro di Toscana Femminile in Italy. She finished fourth at the 2011 Sweden World Cup teams time trial in Vårgårda, Sweden. She finished first at the 2011 Tour de Feminine Krasna Lipa in the Czech Republic. She finished eighth at the 2011 Women's Tour of New Zealand. She finished first in the road race and fourth in the individual time trial at the 2012 Australia Road National Championships in Buninyong, Australia. She finished second at the 2012 Jayco Bay Classic  in Victoria, Australia. She finished fourth at the 2012 Ronde van Gelderland in  the Netherlands. She was selected to represent Australia at the 2012 Summer Olympics in the women's road race, her first Olympics. She finished outside the time limit.

In 2018, Spratt elected to forgo a debut senior Commonwealth Games representation for Australia on the Gold Coast, to focus on an Ardennes campaign in Europe. She achieved her first ever one-day podium at World Tour or World Cup level, with a third placing at the Amstel Gold Race in April. Then in May, she won her first Women's World Tour race with a large enough leading margin to move up ten places on the final stage to also win the general classification at Emakumeen Euskal Bira.

In 2021, Spratt was selected in the Australian team to compete in the road race at the Tokyo Olympics. Unfortunately, she was unable to finish in her event, the Women's Road Race, in very trying conditions.

Major results

2004
 Commonwealth Youth Games
1st  Road race
1st  Time trial
1st  Points race
 2nd Individual pursuit, National Junior Track Championships
 UCI Junior Road World Championships
3rd  Time trial
9th Road race
2005
 2nd Individual pursuit, National Junior Track Championships
2006
 2nd Points race, National Junior Track Championships
 3rd  Individual pursuit, Oceania Games
2007
 National Track Championships
1st  Team pursuit
2nd Individual pursuit
3rd Points race
 2nd Time trial, National Under-23 Road Championships
2008
 1st  Time trial, National Under-23 Road Championships
2010
 8th Overall Tour of New Zealand
2011
 1st  Overall Tour de Feminin-O cenu Českého Švýcarska
1st Stage 1
 4th Open de Suède Vårgårda TTT
2012
 National Road Championships
1st  Road race
4th Time trial
 3rd 7-Dorpenomloop Aalburg
 4th Ronde van Gelderland
 7th GP Comune di Cornaredo
 9th Omloop Het Nieuwsblad
2013
 3rd  Team time trial, UCI Road World Championships
 3rd Open de Suède Vårgårda TTT
 4th Trofeo Alfredo Binda
 6th Overall Thüringen Rundfahrt
 7th EPZ Omloop van Borsele
 8th Overall Grand Prix Elsy Jacobs
2014
 2nd  Team time trial, UCI Road World Championships
 4th Open de Suède Vårgårda TTT 
 5th Road race, National Road Championships
 8th Omloop van het Hageland
2015
 1st Giro del Trentino Alto Adige-Südtirol
 3rd Overall Tour of Norway
 4th Overall Thüringen Rundfahrt
 4th Cadel Evans Great Ocean Road Race
 5th Overall Tour Down Under
 6th SwissEver GP Cham-Hagendorn
 8th Crescent Vårgårda TTT
 9th Overall Emakumeen Euskal Bira
2016
 1st  Road race, National Road Championships
 1st Cadel Evans Great Ocean Road Race
 2nd Overall Thüringen Rundfahrt
1st Stage 6
 5th Overall The Women's Tour
 6th Durango-Durango Emakumeen Saria
 7th Overall Tour Down Under
 7th Crescent Vårgårda
2017
 1st  Overall Tour Down Under
1st Stage 1
 2nd Road race, National Road Championships
 5th Overall Giro d'Italia
 5th Overall Emakumeen Euskal Bira
1st Stage 2
 5th Durango-Durango Emakumeen Saria
 6th La Course by Le Tour de France
 6th Omloop Het Nieuwsblad
 8th Strade Bianche
2018
 1st  Overall Emakumeen Euskal Bira
1st Stage 4
 1st  Overall Tour Down Under
1st  Mountains classification
1st Stage 3
 1st SwissEver GP Cham-Hagendorn
 2nd  Road race, UCI Road World Championships
 2nd Liège–Bastogne–Liège
 2nd Team time trial, Tour of Norway
 3rd Overall Giro Rosa
1st  Mountains classification
1st Stage 6
 3rd Amstel Gold Race
 4th Road race, National Road Championships
 4th Trofeo Alfredo Binda
 5th La Flèche Wallonne
 5th GP de Plouay
 6th Overall Holland Ladies Tour
 7th Strade Bianche
 8th La Course by Le Tour de France
2019
 1st  Overall Tour Down Under
1st Stage 2
 2nd Road race, National Road Championships
 2nd Overall Emakumeen Euskal Bira
1st Stage 2
 2nd Overall Herald Sun Tour
 2nd Trofeo Alfredo Binda
 2nd Durango-Durango Emakumeen Saria
 3rd  Road race, UCI Road World Championships
 3rd Overall Giro Rosa
 3rd Cadel Evans Great Ocean Road Race
 4th Overall Bay Classic Series
1st Stage 1
 5th Overall Tour de Yorkshire
2020
 1st  Road race, National Road Championships
 1st Stage 1 Bay Classic Series 
 3rd Overall Tour Down Under
1st Stage 2
 3rd Cadel Evans Great Ocean Road Race
 8th Durango-Durango Emakumeen Saria
 10th Emakumeen Nafarroako Klasikoa
2021
 4th Amstel Gold Race
 9th La Flèche Wallonne
 10th Liège–Bastogne–Liège
2022
 8th Overall Tour de Romandie
 10th Liège–Bastogne–Liège
2023
 2nd Overall Tour Down Under
 1st Mountains classification
 2nd Cadel Evans Great Ocean Road Race
 2nd Trofeo Oro
 3rd Road race, National Road Championships
 3rd Overall Setmana Ciclista-Volta Comunitat Valenciana Fèmines

See also

 2014 Orica-AIS season

References

External links
 Amanda Spratt at GreenEDGE Cycling
 
 
 
 
 
 
 
 

1987 births
Living people
Australian female cyclists
Olympic cyclists of Australia
Cyclists at the 2012 Summer Olympics
Cyclists at the 2016 Summer Olympics
Cyclists at the 2020 Summer Olympics
Australian Institute of Sport cyclists
People from the Blue Mountains (New South Wales)
Cyclists from New South Wales